Lamaison is a French surname. Notable people with the surname include:

Christophe Lamaison (born 1971), French rugby union footballer
Lydia Lamaison (1914–2012), Argentine actress
Pierre Lamaison (1948–2001), French anthropologist

French-language surnames